Betty Denton (born August 19, 1943) is an American politician who served in the Texas House of Representatives from 1977 to 1995. She was upset in the 1994 tidal wave election by Republican challenger Barbara Rusling.

References

1943 births
Living people
Democratic Party members of the Texas House of Representatives